William George Roerich (December 17, 1912 – November 30, 1995) was an American actor. He is particularly associated with the stage, but also played in many films and TV productions. He was also a stage manager and writer. His name is sometimes given as William Roehrick.

Early life
Roerick was born December 17, 1912 in Hoboken, New Jersey and was a classically trained actor. He graduated from Hamilton College in 1934 and was a student at the Stockbridge Playhouse drama school in 1935.

Career

Acting career
He made his Broadway debut that same year in Romeo and Juliet. He played on Broadway for 45 years, his last Broadway role being in Happy New Year in 1980.

Roerick's career was largely in theater, but he did make appearances in several films. His television roles include the role of Henry Chamberlain in the television soap opera Guiding Light. Roerick played that role from 1980 to 1995 (his death). He was nominated for an Emmy Award for best supporting actor for his work in the show, in 1991. Among his many other television and movie roles, two favorites were in Roger Corman's sci-fi thrillers Not of This Earth and The Wasp Woman.

Writing career
Roerick wrote the family comedy play The Happiest Years, with Thomas Coley. The play was produced on Broadway at the Lyceum Theatre in 1949, featuring Peggy Wood. The New York Daily News was enthusiastic, as was the Albany Times Union ("Leaves a taste in the mouth like mint leaves. A hit and you can quote us.") but it wasn't a hit: it ran for eight performances, opening on April 25 of 1949 and closing on April 30, but was popular for a while for summer stock and amateur productions.

Roerick summered for many years at his home called The Lost Farm in Tyringham, Massachusetts, an old farmhouse on a 90-acre plot that he restored from dilapidation, but which remained without electricity or plumbing. He played summer stock at the Stockbridge Playhouse, and was visited by theatre friends – Shirley Booth and Lynn Bari helped rehabilitate The Lost Farm; visitors included Peggy Wood, Mady Christians, Eleanor Steber, and Samuel Barber, and Roerick hosted parties for the Stockbridge Playhouse troupe.

In 1943, Roerick met author E. M. Forster while touring in Britain with This Is The Army, an Irving Berlin show raising money for emergency relief. The two became friends and Forster stayed with Roerick at The Lost Farm. Forster was quite happy there and dedicated his last book, Two Cheers for Democracy to "William Roerick and 'The Lost Farm' in Tyringham, Massachusetts". Roerick later wrote a memoir essay of this time, Forster in America, and (with Thomas Coley) the play Passage to E. M. Forster, which remains unpublished but has been occasionally presented.

Personal life
Roerick, who was gay, lived both in New York City and at The Lost Farm with his partner and longtime collaborator, fellow actor and writer Thomas Coley. In addition to their two plays, they wrote television scripts together.

Death
Roerick died on November 30, 1995 in an automobile accident, either in Tyringham or the adjacent town of Monterey, Massachusetts.

Appearances

Theatre

Broadway
Romeo and Juliet (1935-1936) with Katharine Cornell
Saint Joan (1936)
Hamlet (1936) with John Gielgud, Lillian Gish and Judith Anderson
Our Town (1938), original production
The Importance of Being Ernest
The Land Is Bright (1941-1942)
Autumn Hill (1942)The Flowers of Virtue (1942)This Is The Army (1942)The Magnificent Yankee (1946)The Great Campaign (1947)The Heiress (1947-1948)Tonight at 8.30 (1948)MedeaMacbethThe Burning Glass (1954)The Right Honorable Gentleman (1965-1966)Marat/Sade (1967)The Homecoming (1967)We Bombed in New Haven (1968)Elizabeth the QueenWaltz of the Toreadors (1973)Night of the Iguana (1976-1977)The Merchant (1977)Happy New Year (1980)

Off-BroadwayMadam, Will You Walk? (1953-1954)The Cherry OrchardCome Slowly EdenPassage to E. M. ForsterTrials of OzClose of PlayTouring and out-of-townOur Town (1939)This Is The Army, international touring company (1940s)Sabrina Fair (1954)Dear Charles, touring company with Tallulah Bankhead (1955)Glad Tidings, touring company with Tallulah Bankhead (1960s)Medea, touring company (1960s)Macbeth, touring company (1960s)Marat/Sade, touring company (1960s)The Time of the Cuckoo (1966)A Cry Of Players (1968), Berkshire Theatre FestivalJanus, opened in Denver, toured; with Myrna Loy (1969)

FilmThis Is the Army (1943) - Mr. Green (uncredited)The Harder They Fall (1956) - Mrs. Harding's Lawyer (uncredited)Not of This Earth (1957) - Dr. F.W. RochelleThe Wasp Woman (1959) - Arthur CooperA Lovely Way to Die (1968) - Loren WestabrookThe Sporting Club (1971) - FortesqueThe Love Machine (1971) - Cliff DorneA Separate Peace (1972) -Mr. Patchwithers, HeadmasterThe Day of the Dolphin (1973) - Dunhill - Foundation92 in the Shade (1975) - RudleighThe Other Side of the Mountain (1975) - Dr. PittmanGod Told Me To (1976) - RichardsThe Betsy (1978) - Secretary of Commerce

TelevisionA Time of Innocence (Suspense) (1952)The General's Bible (Hallmark Hall of Fame) (1953)To My Valentine (Hallmark Hall of Fame) (1953)Star Bright (Kraft Theatre) (1953)I'll Always Love You, Natalie (Studio 57) (1955)Big Town (1956)The Louella Parsons Story (Climax!) (1956)The Millionaire (1956)Strange Disappearance  (The Ford Television Theatre) (1957)Eloise (Playhouse 90) (1956)Paris Calling (Lux Video Theatre) (1957)The Man Who Played God (Lux Video Theatre) (1957)Perry Mason (1957)The Thin Man (1957)Topaze (Playhouse 90) (1957)The Last Tycoon (Playhouse 90) (1957)How to Marry a Millionaire (1958)The Violent Heart (Playhouse 90) (1958)The Gale Storm Show (1958)Mike Hammer (1958)Hudson's Bay (1958)The Third Man (1959)The Man from Blackhawk (1959)Five Fingers (1960)
The Man in the Funny Suit (Westinghouse Desilu Playhouse) (1960)
Shotgun Slade (1960)
The Clear Horizon (1959–1962)
Dr. Kildare (1962)
Follow the Sun (1962)
Another World (1974-1975, 1977)
For the People (1965)
This Town Will Never Be the Same (TV movie, 1969)
NET Playhouse (1972)
Particular Men (TV movie, 1972)
Madigan (1973)
The Adams Chronicles (miniseries, 1976)
Guiding Light (1974, 1980–1995)
Freedom to Speak (miniseries, 1983)
The Thorns (1988)
Law & Order (1990–1991)

Works

Roerick, with Thomas Coley, wrote scripts for TV shows including Mama, Crime Photographer, Claudia, The Billy Rose Show and The Kate Smith Show

References

External links

1912 births
1995 deaths
Road incident deaths in Massachusetts
20th-century American male actors
American male Shakespearean actors
American male stage actors
Male actors from New York City
People from Tyringham, Massachusetts
American gay actors
LGBT people from New Jersey